Impressions Media is an American privately owned publisher of newspapers in Northeastern Pennsylvania, USA. It is headquartered in Wilkes-Barre, Pennsylvania, and owned by Philadelphia-based Versa Capital Management.

Holdings 
The company publishes Times Leader, a daily newspaper in Wilkes-Barre, and several weekly newspapers covering surrounding communities:

 The Abington Journal of Clarks Summit, Pennsylvania, founded 1947
 The Dallas Post of Dallas, Pennsylvania, founded 1889
 Go Lackawanna of Scranton, Pennsylvania, founded 2010
 The Sunday Dispatch of Pittston, Pennsylvania
 Weekender entertainment weekly covering Northeastern Pennsylvania, founded 1993

External links 
 Impressions Media
 Versa Capital Management

Newspaper companies of the United States